La música más pura y bella de Venezuela, is a Venezuelan music album, made by Juan Vicente Torrealba, Mario Suárez and Los Torrealberos, with the seal  Discos Banco Largo , in this album presents different famous Torrealba's songs.

Track listing 

Side A

01- Volveras (Germán Fleitas Beroes/Juan Vicente Torrealba)

02- Guayanesa (Germán Fleitas Beroes/Juan Vicente Torrealba)

03- Barloventeño (Juan Vicente Torrealba)

04- Aguacerito (Manuel Pérez Cruzzatti/Juan Vicente Torrealba)

Side B

01- Muchachita Sabanera (Germán Fleitas Beroes/Juan Vicente Torrealba)

02- Cariñito (Juan Vicente Torrealba)

03- Primaveral (Germán Fleitas Beroes/Juan Vicente Torrealba)

04- El Maraquero (Juan Vicente Torrealba)

Musicians 
Harp: Juan Vicente Torrealba
Vocals: Mario Suárez
Group: Los Torrealberos

Sources 
Sincopa.com

Juan Vicente Torrealba albums